The Magic Flute (1791) is an opera by Wolfgang Amadeus Mozart. Other notable works with this title include:

Ballet
 The Magic Flute (ballet) (1893) by Lev Ivanov to music by Riccardo Drigo

Film
 The Magic Flute (1975), Swedish: Trollflöjten, by Ingmar Bergman
 The Smurfs and the Magic Flute (1976), Belgian animated film
 The Magic Flute (2006) a film by Kenneth Branagh
 Magic Flute Diaries (2008), a film by Kevin Sullivan
 The Magic Flute (2022), a film by Florian Sigl

Literature
 Krishnavatara (The Magic Flute), the first of a series of novels based on the Indian epic Mahabharata and the life of Krishna by K. M. Munshi

Musicals
 The Magic Flute (musical) (2007)

Opera
 The Magic Flute's Second Part (Der Zauberflöte zweyter Theil. Das Labyrinth oder Der Kampf mit den Elementen), 1798 heroic-comic opera by Emanuel Schikaneder, with music by Peter von Winter

See also
 14877 Zauberflöte, main belt asteroid